Ian Guy Hutchings (born 26 March 1968) is a professional golfer from Zimbabwe who lives in South Africa. He is currently a member of the Sunshine Tour and a former member of the Canadian Tour. He collected two wins in South Africa in 1994 and 1996, four wins in Canada, and other international victories. His best ever finish on the Sunshine Tour Order of Merit was 14th in 1994. He has over R1,500,000 career earnings on the Sunshine Tour.

Amateur highlights
12 Amateur wins
1987/1988 Springbok

Professional wins (8)

Sunshine Tour wins (2)

Canadian Tour wins (4)

Other wins (2)
1992 Bidvest Sun-City Pro-Am (South Africa non-Order of Merit event)
1995 Los Leones Open (Chile)

References

External links

Zimbabwean male golfers
South African male golfers
Sunshine Tour golfers
1968 births
Living people